The VL19 (Cyrillic script: ВЛ19) was the first class of electric locomotives designed in the Soviet Union. Earlier classes had been designed in the United States and Italy.  The VL19s were produced from 1932 to 1938 and became the main freight and passenger DC electric locomotives in the Soviet Union.  They were built for 1,500 volt DC but some were later converted to dual voltage.  The designation VL was in honour of Vladimir Lenin and "19" Indicates a 19-ton axle load.

Equipment
The locomotives had a Co-Co wheel arrangement and there were six 340 kW traction motors giving a total output of 2,040 kW. The gear ratio was 3.74:1 and the wheels were 48 inch diameter. Following the introduction of 3,000 volt DC electrification, some locomotives were converted to dual voltage, 1,500 or 3,000 volt DC.

Preservation
Two locomotives have been preserved:

References

Railway locomotives introduced in 1932
Electric locomotives of the Soviet Union
1500 V DC locomotives
5 ft gauge locomotives